Kidder is an unincorporated community in Wayne County, Kentucky, United States. Its post office  is closed.

References

Unincorporated communities in Wayne County, Kentucky
Unincorporated communities in Kentucky